The Rembarrnga people, also spelt Rembarunga and other variants, are an Aboriginal Australian people of the Northern Territory.

Language

The Rembarrnga language is a non-Pama-Nyungan language belonging to the Gunwinyguan language family.

Country

Alternative names
 Rembarrnga, Rembaranga, Rembarnga, Rembranga.
 Ranjbarngo, Rainbarngo, Reinbaranga.
 Rembarrna.
 Maiadi.
 Maieli, Majali, Maiali, Maielli.

Notes

Citations

Sources

Aboriginal peoples of the Northern Territory
Arnhem Land